The 1996 North Carolina gubernatorial election was held on 5 November 1996.  The general election was fought between the Democratic nominee, incumbent Governor Jim Hunt and the Republican nominee, state representative Robin Hayes.  Hunt won by 56% to 43%, winning his fourth term as governor.

Primaries

Republican

Democratic
Jim Hunt won the Democratic nomination unopposed.

General election results

Footnotes

Governor
North Carolina
1996